The men's Greco-Roman light heavyweight was a Greco-Roman wrestling event held as part of the Wrestling at the 1920 Summer Olympics programme. It was the third appearance of the event. Light heavyweight was the second heaviest category, including wrestlers weighing up to 82.5 kilograms.

A total of 18 wrestlers from 11 nations competed in the event, which was held from August 16 to August 20, 1920.

Results

Gold medal round

Silver medal round

References

External links
 
 

Wrestling at the 1920 Summer Olympics